Aleksei Relke is a commander of the pro-Russian militant group Army of the South-East.

Along with Valery Bolotov, he participated in attack on the SBU headquarters in Luhansk on April 6, 2014. Relke was detained by local SBU on April 5, 2014. However, during the attack on SBU headquarters the chief of militsiya in Luhansk Oblast Volodymyr Huslavsky requested the chief of SBU to sign a release for Relke.

References

Living people
Pro-Russian people of the 2014 pro-Russian unrest in Ukraine
People of the Luhansk People's Republic
Year of birth missing (living people)
Place of birth missing (living people)